Achnairn is a village in the Scottish council area of Highland, situated on the east side of Loch Shin.

References 

Populated places in Sutherland